Hu Xiaoxin is a former female international table tennis player from China.

Table tennis career
She won a gold medal at the 1989 World Table Tennis Championships in the Corbillon Cup (women's team event) with Chen Jing, Chen Zihe and Li Huifen for China.  

In addition she won a silver medal in the women's doubles in 1989 with Chen Jing and a bronze medal in the women's doubles with Liu Wei at the 1991 World Table Tennis Championships.

See also
 List of table tennis players
 List of World Table Tennis Championships medalists

References

 http://www.ittf.com/ittf_stats/All_events3.asp?ID=2997

Year of birth missing (living people)
Living people
Chinese female table tennis players
People from Tianmen
Table tennis players from Hubei